Kings Creek is a stream located entirely within Champaign County, Ohio.

Kings Creek is said to have received its name on account of an Indian chief being killed near its banks.

See also
List of rivers of Ohio

References

Rivers of Champaign County, Ohio
Rivers of Ohio